Abdur Rob Serniabat (1921-1975) was a Bangladeshi politician and the former water resources minister. He was the brother-in-law of Sheikh Mujibur Rahman, founding father of Bangladesh, and the maternal uncle of Sheikh Hasina, the four-time prime minister of Bangladesh. He was killed during the assassination of Sheikh Mujibur Rahman on 15 August 1975.

Early life
Abdur Rab Serniabat was born in the village of Sarail in Agailjhara, Barisal, in 1921.

Career
At early stages in his career, Abdur Rob Serniabat was a lawyer in Borishal city. He later carried out his appointed role as the minister of Water Resources for Government of the People's Republic of Bangladesh, soon after Bangladesh's liberation from Pakistani ruling.

Assassination

His house on 27 Minto Road, Dhaka was attacked at about 5:00 AM by soldiers commanded by Major Shahriar Rashid, Major Aziz Pasha, Captain Nurul Huda and Captain Majed. Abdur Rob Serniabat, daughter Baby Serniabat, son Arif Serniabat, his nephew Shaheed Serniabat, Grandson Sukanto Babu were among those killed while his wife Amena Begum, Shahan Ara Begum, Abul Hasnat Abdullah's wife daughter Beauty Serniabat was injured along with others in the house. His sons Abul Hasnat Abdullah and his another son Abul Khair Abdullah Granddaughter Kanta Abdullah and survived. A case was filed regarding this incident at Ramna Police Station on 21 October 1996, convicting 18 people. His son Abul Hasnat Abdullah was elected a member of parliament in 2014. His house is now part of headquarters complex of Dhaka Metropolitan Police. On 30 July 2018, his grandson, Serniabat Sadiq Abdullah, was elected Mayor of Borishal.

Legacy
Shaheed Abdur Rob Serniabat Stadium at Borishal Division in Bangladesh is named after him. SARSTEC, a technological college for textiles education which is located at the same division has also been named honoring him.

References

Awami League politicians
Bangladesh Liberation War
1975 deaths
Burials at Banani Graveyard
Sheikh Mujibur Rahman family
Water Resources ministers
1921 births
Bangladesh Krishak Sramik Awami League central committee members